TC OT 39 is a non-peptide partial agonist of the oxytocin and vasopressin V2 receptors (Ki = 147 nM and >1000 nM, respectively) and antagonist of the vasopressin V1A receptor (Ki = 330 nM).

See also
 WAY-267,464

References

Benzodiazepines
Pyrrolidines
Benzamides
Oxytocin receptor agonists
Vasopressin receptor agonists
Vasopressin receptor antagonists
Thioamides